Kumkapı is an indefinitely closed railway station on the İstanbul-Halkalı Line in Istanbul. The station was built in 1872 by the Rumelia Railway as part of the extension of their mainline into İstanbul's city center. The station was rebuilt and electrified in 1955 for the start of commuter service between Sirkeci and Halkalı. Kumkapı was indefinitely closed in 2013 due to the rehabilitation and construction of the new Marmaray line.

References

External links
 İstanbul-Halkalı Line Timetables - Westbound
 İstanbul-Halkalı Line Timetables - Eastbound

Fatih
Railway stations in Istanbul Province
Railway stations opened in 1872
Railway stations closed in 2013
1872 establishments in the Ottoman Empire
Defunct railway stations in Turkey